The French submarine Nautilus was a  built for the French Navy in the mid-1930s. Laid down in August 1927, it was launched in March 1930 and commissioned in July 1931. Nautilus was disarmed at Bizerte, Tunisia and captured there on 8 December 1942 by Italian forces. On 31 January 1943, it was sunk at Bizerte during an Allied air raid. Nautilus was raised but not repaired and finally stricken on 12 August 1947.

Design
Propulsion while surfaced was provided by two  Normand-Vickers diesel motors and while submerged two  electric motors. The submarines electrical propulsion allowed it to attain speeds of 
 while submerged.

The Saphir-class submarines were constructed to be able to launch torpedoes and lay mines without surfacing. They were attached to the submarine's exterior under a hydrodynamic protection and were jettisoned with compressed air. The Saphir-class submarines also featured an automatic depth regulator that automatically flooded ballast tanks after mines were dropped to prevent the risk of the submarine surfacing in the middle of enemy waters.

See also 

 List of submarines of France
 French submarines of World War II

Citations

References 
 

Submarines of France
World War II submarines of France
Saphir-class submarines (1928)
Submarines sunk by aircraft
World War II shipwrecks in the Mediterranean Sea
1930 ships